Jarmila Gajdošová and Storm Sanders were the defending champions, but Gajdošová chose not to participate. Sanders partnered up with Destanee Aiava, but lost in the quarterfinals to Misa Eguchi and Katarzyna Piter.
Irina Falconi and Petra Martić won the title, defeating Han Xinyun and Junri Namigata in the final, 6–2, 6–4.

Seeds

Draw

References 
 Draw

McDonald's Burnie International - Doubles
Burnie International